Sancus is a genus of long-jawed orb-weavers that was first described by Hugo Albert Tullgren in 1910.  it contains two species, found in Tanzania, Kenya, and on the Azores: S. acoreensis and S. bilineatus. The name "Sancus" is currently accepted by the World Spider Catalog, but it was already in use for a genus of skippers when this genus was named.

See also
 Sancus (skipper)
 List of Tetragnathidae species

References

Araneomorphae genera
Tetragnathidae